Newfoundland and Labrador is a province of Canada on the country's Atlantic coast in northeastern North America. People from Newfoundland and Labrador are called "Newfoundlanders," "Labradorians" (as appropriate), or "Newfoundlanders and Labradorians".

Population history
Since entering confederation, Newfoundland and Labrador has always been ranked 9th among provinces in population.

Source: Statistics Canada

Population geography

Cities and towns

Census Metropolitan Areas and Census Agglomerations in the province by population

Municipalities by population

Ethnicity
More than half the population identified their ethnocultural ancestry as Canadian, while two-fifths identified English ancestry, and one-fifth identified Irish ancestry.

More than 100,000 Newfoundlanders have applied for membership in the Qalipu Mi'kmaq First Nation Band, equivalent to one-fifth of the total population.

The same data on ethnocultural ancestry, grouped more geographically by Statistics Canada, are shown below:

Percentages are calculated as a proportion of the total number of respondents (508,075) and may total more than 100% due to dual responses. Only groups of more than 0.02% are shown

Visible minorities and Aboriginals

Languages

Knowledge of languages 
The question on knowledge of languages allows for multiple responses. The following figures are from the 2021 Canadian Census, and lists languages that were selected by at least 0.2 per cent of respondents.

Mother tongue 

The 2006 Canadian census showed a population of 505,469.Of the 499,830 singular responses to the census question concerning mother tongue the most commonly reported languages were:

Note: "n.i.e.": not included elsewhere

There were also about 25 single-language responses for Amharic, 25 for Bisayan languages, 20 for Sinhala and 20 for Slovak. In addition, there were also 435 responses of English and a non-official language; 30 of French and a non-official language; 295 of English and French; and 10 of English, French, and a non-official language. (Figures shown are for the number of single language responses and the percentage of total single-language responses.)

Religion

A 93.2% majority of Newfoundlanders identify as Christian. Among this group, Roman Catholics form a plurality of 38.4%. As Newfoundland and Labrador has received less recent immigration than the rest of Canada, a relatively small number of Christian denominations are represented in the province.

One well-established feature of Newfoundland's religious landscape is the Salvation Army, whose members are more widespread in Newfoundland and Labrador than any other province. Also notable are missionaries of the Moravian Church, who have a long history with the Labrador Inuit of Nunatsiavut, although they were not active in other regions of the province.

Migration

Immigration 

The 2021 census reported that immigrants (individuals born outside Canada) comprise 14,250 persons or 2.8 percent of the total population of Newfoundland and Labrador.

Recent immigration 
The 2021 Canadian census counted a total of 4,270 people who immigrated to Newfoundland and Labrador between 2016 and 2021.

Interprovincial migration

Since it started being recorded in 1971, Newfoundland and Labrador is the province that has lost the biggest share of its population to interprovincial migration, which was especially high in the 1990s. Out-migration from the province was curtailed in 2008 and net migration stayed positive through 2014, when it again dropped due to bleak finances and rising unemployment (caused by falling oil prices). With the announcement of the 2016 provincial budget, St. John's Telegram columnist Russell Wangersky published the column "Get out if you can", which urged young Newfoundlanders to leave the province to avoid future hardships.

Source: Statistics Canada

See also

Demographics of Canada
Population of Canada by province and territory

References

Newfoundland and Labrador
Newfoundland and Labrador society